Blob emoji is an implementation of emojis by Google featured in its Android mobile operating system between 2013 and 2017.

History 

Google introduced the blobs as part of its Android KitKat mobile operating system in 2013. The next year, Google expanded the blob style to include the emojis that normally depict humans. As an example, instead of a flamenco dancer in Apple emoji style and its derivates, Google's blob style showed a less glamorous blob with a rose in its teeth. In 2016, Google redesigned the blobs into a gumdrop-shape. As Unicode, the group that establishes emoji standards, introduced skin tone and gender options to emojis, Google's emojis progressively appeared more as humans and less as yellow, amorphous blobs. Google retired the blobs in 2017 with the release of Android Oreo in favor of circular emojis similar in style to that of other platforms. Consistent cross-platform emoji interpretation was among the redesign's primary aims. The redesign, which had been in development for about a year, mimicked an Apple effort to include more detail in the emoji glyph and offer yellow skin tone as the default. Despite their deprecation, Google's Gmail continued to use the blob emojis, as of 2022.

Reception 

The blob emoji were a divisive feature between 2013 and 2017. Proponents praised their novel interpretation of emoji ideograms while detractors criticized the miscommunication that results when emoji are interpreted differently across platforms.

Google released sticker packs featuring blob emoji for Gboard and Android Messages in 2018.

References

Further reading

External links 

Emoji typefaces
Android (operating system)